Kornidzor is a village in the Tegh Municipality of the Syunik Province in Armenia.

Demographics 
The Statistical Committee of Armenia reported its population was 1,326 in 2010, up from 1,072 at the 2001 census.

Gallery

References 

Populated places in Syunik Province